Fargoa bartschi is a species of sea snail, a marine gastropod mollusk in the family Pyramidellidae, the pyrams and their allies.

Distribution
This species occurs in the following locations:
 Cobscook Bay
 Gulf of Maine
 Gulf of Mexico
 North West Atlantic

Notes
Additional information regarding this species:
 Distribution: Range: 45°N to 28°N; 97°W to 68°W. Distribution: Cobscook Bay to Massachusetts, New Jersey, North Carolina, South Carolina, Texas

References

External links
 To Biodiversity Heritage Library (3 publications)
 To Encyclopedia of Life
 To ITIS
 To World Register of Marine Species

Pyramidellidae
Gastropods described in 1909